Samastha Keralam PO is a 2009 Indian Malayalam political drama film by Bipin Prabhakar starring Jayaram, Priyanka Nair and Jagathy Sreekumar.

Plot 
Member Prabakaran is a Gandhian and Panchayat Member in Thonnurkara village who always thinks about the welfare of the people. He is willing to fight against the ruling party as well as with the opposition when he sees injustice being done. Such a selfless politician naturally earns more enemies than friends and his enemies join hands against him.

Cast

Soundtrack
Lyrics penned by Vayalar.

"Kulirengum Thooviyethum" - Vineeth Sreenivasan
"Poonthen Nilave" - Rimi Tomy
"Maandhara Manavaatti" - Manjari
"Sundari Sundari" - Vijay Yesudas
"Pandente Arikathu" - Jithendra Varma

Box office
The film was a commercial failure at box office.

References

External links 
 https://www.indiaglitz.com/samastha-keralam-po-review-malayalam-movie-10924

Films scored by M. Jayachandran
Indian political drama films
Films shot in Thrissur
2009 films
2000s Malayalam-language films